Anarkali may refer to:

Films
 Anarkali (1928 film), a 1928 silent film by R. S. Choudhury, starring Ruby Myers a.k.a. Sulochana
 Anarkali (1953 film), a 1953 Hindi film starring Pradeep Kumar, Bina Rai, and Noor Jehan
 Anarkali (1955 film), a 1955 Telugu/Tamil film starring Akkineni Nageswara Rao and Anjali Devi
 Anarkali (1966 film), a 1966 Malayalam film starring Prem Nazir, K. R. Vijaya, and Sathyan
 Anarkali (2015 film), a 2015 Malayalam film

People
 Anarkali, a legendary slave girl from the Mughal period
 Anarkali Akarsha, a Sri Lankan actress
 Anarkali Kaur Honaryar, an Afghan politician and a women's rights activist

Places
 Tomb of Anarkali, a tomb in Lahore, thought to be that of either Anarkali, or Sahib-i-Jamal Begum
 Anarkali Bazaar, a market located near Anarkali's tomb on Mall Road in Lahore

Clothing
 Anarkali Salwar Suit originating in Mughal times and popular among kathak dancers in India